Edial Hall School was a school established in 1735 by Samuel Johnson at Edial, near Lichfield. Here, Johnson taught Latin and Greek to young gentlemen.  The funds for the school were provided by his wife, "Tetty" Johnson.

It only had three pupils, one of whom was David Garrick, and it was only open for about a year, after which Johnson was forced to close it due to a lack of funds.

References

1735 establishments in England
Defunct schools in Staffordshire
Educational institutions established in 1735
1730s disestablishments in Great Britain